North Branch Township may refer to the following places in the United States:

 North Branch Township, Michigan
 North Branch Township, Isanti County, Minnesota
 North Branch Township, Wyoming County, Pennsylvania

See also

 Branch Township (disambiguation)
 South Branch Township (disambiguation)
 West Branch Township (disambiguation)
 North Branch (disambiguation)

Township name disambiguation pages